Jean Heller is an American writer and former investigative journalist. She is best known for publishing the news of the Tuskegee syphilis study in 1972, and reporting that the United States claims of an Iraqi buildup on the Saudi Arabian border during the Gulf War in 1990 was not accurate.  She has reported for the St. Petersburg Times, Newsday and the Associated Press.

Education 
Jean Heller graduated from The Ohio State University School of Journalism in 1964.

Career 
In 1972, Associated Press colleague Edith Lederer provided Heller with evidence she had received from whistleblower Peter Buxtun detailing that, for four decades, people enrolled in the Tuskegee study had been deliberately denied treatment for syphilis. Years later, Heller called the story "one of the grossest violations of human rights I can imagine". Her article exposing the unethical study was published in the Washington Star on July 25, 1972, and it became front-page news in the New York Times the following day. The exposé earned Heller the Robert F. Kennedy Journalism Award, the Raymond Clapper Award, and the George Polk Award.

Heller also writes the Deuce Mora series of novels, which feature a fictional Chicago newspaper columnist.

Personal life 
Heller lives in North Carolina.

References

American women journalists
Living people
Year of birth missing (living people)
21st-century American women